Rühl or Ruehl (in Denmark the name is predominantly written as Ryhl since the latter half of the 19th century) is a surname of Germanic origin. It may refer to:
Carl-Heinz Rühl (1939–2019), German football player and manager
Fritz Rühl (1836–1893), Swiss entomologist
Johan Rühl (1885–1972), Netherlands Olympic water polo player
Markus Rühl (born 1972), German professional bodybuilder
Mercedes Ruehl (born 1948), American theater and film actress, sister of Peter Ruehl
Peter Ruehl (1947–2011), American-born Australian newspaper columnist
Philippe Rühl (1737–1795), German-French statesman

German-language surnames